Alone is a song by Belgian recording artist Selah Sue. It was written by Sue along with Sean Fenton and Robin Hannibal, and produced by the latter for her second studio album Reason (2015), featuring co-production from Itai Shapira and Salva. Distributed by Warner Music Group, it was released by Because Music on 27 October 2014 as the album's lead single.

Formats and track listings

Charts

Weekly charts

Year-end charts

References

External links
SelahSue.com – official website

2014 songs
2014 singles
Selah Sue songs
Because Music singles
Songs written by Robin Hannibal
Songs written by Selah Sue
Songs written by Elijah Blake